Isabelle Sarech is a French former competitive ice dancer. With her skating partner, Xavier Debernis, she became the 1989 Nebelhorn Trophy champion, 1990 Skate America silver medalist, 1991 Skate Electric bronze medalist, and a two-time French national bronze medalist.

Sarech lived in Annecy before teaming up with Debernis. She then relocated to Lyon in order to train with him. The two were coached by Gérard G., the husband of Debernis' elder sister.

In February 2020, Sarech accused Gérard G. of sexually abusing her when she was a minor.

Competitive highlights 
 with Debernis

References 

French female ice dancers
Living people
Year of birth missing (living people)
20th-century French women